Jakubov is a village in Malacky District, Bratislava Region, Slovakia. It may also refer to
Jakubov u Moravských Budějovic, a village and municipality in Třebíč District, Vysočina Region, Czech Republic
Lesní Jakubov, a village and municipality in Třebíč District, Vysočina Region, Czech Republic
Jakubova Voľa, a village and municipality in Sabinov District, Prešov Region, Slovakia
Jakubov (surname)

See also
Jakubów (disambiguation)